Spychała may refer to:
 Czesław Spychała (1917–1994), Polish tennis player
 Mateusz Spychała (born 1998), Polish footballer

See also
 
 Marian Spychalski (1906–1980), Polish architect, military commander, and politician

Polish-language surnames